Otar Gabelia (born 24 March 1953) is a Georgian football manager and a former player. He was a long-time goalkeeper for Dinamo Tbilisi. Winner of the Best Soviet Goalkeeper Award (1979), Gabelia is regarded by pundits as one of the best Georgian goalkeepers of all time.

Playing career
Gabelia spent his club career at FC Dinamo Zugdidi, playing from 1970 to 1971, at FC Dinamo Sukhumi, from 1972 to 1973, at FC Torpedo Kutaisi, from 1974 to 1976 and from 1983 to 1984, at FC Dinamo Tbilisi, from 1977 to 1982 and from 1985 to 1989.

He won the Soviet championship in 1978 and Soviet Cup in 1979 and was named Best Soviet Goalkeeper in 1979. He was known for his emotional style of play with excellent reaction.

In 1981 he won UEFA Cup Winners Cup, which was the biggest achievement of his sport career.

Honours

Club
Dinamo Tbilisi
Soviet Top League: 1978
Soviet Cup: 1979
UEFA Cup Winners Cup: 1981

Individual
Soviet Goalkeeper of the Year: 1979

International career
Gabelia played his only game for USSR on 21 November 1979 in a friendly against West Germany.

References

External links
 
 Otar Gabelia • Profile on rusteam.permian.ru.
 Otar Gabelia • Profile on allfutbolist.ru.
 Otar Gabelia • Profile on footballplayers.ru.
 Otar Gabelia • Profile on national-football-teams.com.
 Otar Gabelia • Articles on sport-express.ru.
 Otar Gabelia • Articles on FC Dinamo Tbilisi Official website.

1953 births
Living people
Soviet footballers
Soviet Union international footballers
Soviet Top League players
FC Dinamo Sukhumi players
FC Torpedo Kutaisi players
FC Dinamo Tbilisi players
Footballers from Georgia (country)
Football managers from Georgia (country)
FC Zugdidi managers
FC Dinamo Batumi managers
FC Alazani Gurjaani managers
Association football goalkeepers
Recipients of the Order of Honor (Georgia)